The Battle of Sukhumi took place in 1992 between Abkhaz separatists and the Georgian National Guard. The battle marked the start of one of the bloodiest wars in Post-Soviet Georgia.

Background
In July 1992, Georgian officials were taken hostage by Pro-Gamsukhurdia forces (known as Zviadists) in Mingrelia, being later moved to the Gali Region of Abkhazia. Several more were taken when Georgian officials attempted to negotiate with them.  In response, Georgian police created assault units to help free the hostages. The Abkhaz Interior Ministry said that Georgian and Abkhaz Units would cooperate to help free the hostages. In August, a National Guard unit was deployed in Gali to help release the hostages and the hostages were freed by August 19 without full-scale combat.

Entering Sukhumi
However, the 1,000 man strong assault unit created by the police did not stop at Gali. They then launched an attack on the capital, Sukhumi to retake the city for Georgia. They took the city's airport, which was 25 kilometers from the city. A news blockade was imposed on journalists, and by noon they were forcibly entering Sukhumi. Georgian Tanks and APC's moved through the streets, battling Abkhaz militias who were armed with machine guns and formed barricades in the streets, while hurling Molotov cocktails as they lacked heavy anti-tank weapons. Georgian units used artillery against Abkhaz separatists in the places they controlled within the city.

Despite Abkhaz resistance, the Georgian units were heavily armed and took the city within a matter of days. On 18 August, the Parliament of Abkhazia was stormed by the Georgian National Guard, and the Georgian flag was raised on the Council of Ministers buildings. All of Sukhumi was taken by August 18.

Casualties and aftermath
On August 16, 19 people were killed and 39 severely injured, but on August 18 the death toll has increased to at least 50 people killed. Georgian units were accused of looting, assault, murder and other ethnically based war crimes. Abkhaz separatists retreated to Guduata, and started to arm themselves for a counterattack.

References

Conflicts in 1992
Abkhaz–Georgian conflict
August 1992 events in Asia